The STA Plaza (The Plaza or Spokane Transit Authority Plaza), is a transit center located in Downtown Spokane, Washington. It is the main hub of customer service and transit operations for the Spokane Transit Authority (STA), with 29 out of its 44 bus routes beginning and terminating at The Plaza. Transit operations through the Plaza resemble that of an airline hub, with banks of buses arriving and departing in waves (as frequently as every 7 minutes), providing timed transfer opportunities for passengers.

It is one of Spokane Transit's three primary transit centers, along with the Spokane Community College and Pence-Cole Valley transit centers.

The facility opened in the summer of 1995 and was designed by Tan Boyle Heyamoto Architects.

History
Prior to the construction of the STA Plaza, Spokane Transit's downtown bus operations were dispersed outdoors along downtown streets obstructing storefronts and congesting sidewalks.

As early as the 1970s, discussions were in place to centralize operations and create an indoor facility for passengers to wait and make transfers. The initial proposal was a public-private partnership that would have built the transit center on the ground floor of a new high rise office and retail building. However, after the deal collapsed, the plan evolved into a two-story building to be developed by Spokane Transit Authority.

The interior of the STA Plaza underwent a major renovation in 2017. Open space within the plaza atrium was expanded and improvements such as electronic arrival monitoring boards were added.

References

External links
 

Transit centers in the United States
Transportation in Spokane, Washington
Spokane, Washington
Transport infrastructure completed in 1995
Bus stations in Washington (state)
Transportation buildings and structures in Spokane County, Washington